Laurence Halsall (1872–1919) was an English footballer who played in the Football League for Blackpool and Preston North End.

References

1872 births
1919 deaths
English footballers
Association football forwards
English Football League players
Southport F.C. players
Blackpool F.C. players
Preston North End F.C. players